Roger Pratt may refer to:

Roger Pratt (architect) (1620–1684), English gentleman architect
Roger Pratt (cinematographer), British cinematographer
Roger Pratt (cyclist) (born 1944), Welsh cyclist